Judge Bulter may refer to:

Frank Burgess (1935–2010), judge of the United States District Court for the Western District of Washington
Timothy M. Burgess (born 1956), judge of the United States District Court for the District of Alaska

See also
Justice Burgess (disambiguation)